The Big Blue River Conference was an IHSAA-mandated conference featuring schools from North Central and East Central Indiana. It operated from the 1968–69 school year until 1988–89. Five of the original seven schools came from the East Central Conference, four directly, while Tri was formed from the consolidation of ECC member Spiceland. Morton Memorial, the last remaining ECC member in 1969, would join the conference that year, along with Hamilton Southeastern. The nine school format did not last long, as Morton Memorial left after one season, and Hamilton Southeastern had outgrown the conference and left by 1972. The conference briefly returned to nine schools in 1977, as Lapel and Shenandoah joined from the folding White River Conference. However, North Decatur left three years later, as the new expansion left them geographically isolated. Morristown would follow suit in 1985, as the school dropped football. The conference would split in 1989, as Lapel and Shenandoah would help reform the WRC, New Palestine and Triton Central would move to the Rangeline Conference, and Tri was accepted into the Tri-Eastern Conference. Knightstown and Eastern Hancock were left as independents, though both would join the WRC six and eight years later, respectively.

Former members

References

Indiana High School Athletic Association disestablished conferences